Pasturana is a comune (municipality) in the Province of Alessandria in the Italian region Piedmont, located about  southeast of Turin and about  southeast of Alessandria.

Pasturana borders the following municipalities: Basaluzzo, Francavilla Bisio, Novi Ligure, and Tassarolo.

Demographic evolution

References

External links
 www.comune.pasturana.al.it

Cities and towns in Piedmont